This is a list of Youngstown State Penguins football players in the NFL Draft.

Key

Selections

References

Youngstown State

Youngstown State Penguins NFL Draft